The 1894 Illinois Fighting Illini football team was an American football team that represented the University of Illinois during the 1894 college football season.  In their first season under head coach Louis Vail, the Illini compiled a 4–3 record. Tackle James E. Pfeffer was the team captain.

Schedule

Roster

Source: University of Illinois

References

Illinois
Illinois Fighting Illini football seasons
Illinois Fighting Illini football